Dane End is a  hamlet to the north of Ware in Hertfordshire, England situated between the A602 and A10. It is within Little Munden civil parish and East Hertfordshire District Council. It has a population of around 700. Dane End means the 'valley ends' and is located where a tributary of the River Lea comes off the surrounding chalk. Little Munden church and school are sited on the hill on the north side of Dane End.

Little Munden Primary School

Little Munden School is a Church of England voluntary controlled primary school. It was founded in 1819 at All Saints Church by the Reverend J P Reynolds, who served as rector from 1819 to 1831. The school was designated as a Grade II listed building by English Heritage in 1984 as an early example of a parish school.

Sport
Football club Dane End United play in the East Hertfordshire Corinthians League, a local Sunday football league, and Ware and District five-a-side league. They play their home games in Horses Meadow. The Little Munden Cricket Club play at nearby Green End. Currently, it plays in the Herts & Essex Cricket League, Division 3.

References

External links

Hamlets in Hertfordshire
East Hertfordshire District